The 1961 Boston Patriots season was the franchise's second season in the American Football League They finished with nine wins, four losses, and one tie, in second place in the AFL's Eastern Division.

Staff

Season summary 
In the off-season, the team acquired quarterback Babe Parilli from the Oakland Raiders, himself a former starter for the NFL's Green Bay Packers. After a 2–3 start and two consecutive losses, the team fired head coach Lou Saban on the night of Tuesday, October 10, and replaced him with offensive backfield coach Mike Holovak, formerly the head coach at Boston College. The change was a positive one, as the team was 7–1–1 under Holovak and finished on a four-game winning streak, capped with a road shutout of the Western Division champion San Diego Chargers in the season finale, the team which scored 38 points on them in Boston in Saban's last game.

The Patriots' 9–4–1 record put them in second place in the Eastern Division, one game behind Houston; the Oilers went on to win the league championship with a 10–3 win over the Chargers. This was the first season in which Boston used their "Pat the Patriot" logo on their helmets.

Draft picks

Schedule

Regular season

Standings

Roster 

All of the following players appeared in at least one game for the 1961 Boston Patriots.

Players new to the team in 1961 are in bold.

Notes and references

General references 
 . For game-by-game results
 . For team roster
 . For season summary

Footnoted references 

Boston Patriots
New England Patriots seasons
Boston Patriots
1960s in Boston